Bijie Feixiong Airport  is an airport serving the city of Bijie in Guizhou Province, China.  It is located in Dafang County,  from the city center. Construction began in May 2011 with a total investment of 1.05 billion CNY, and the airport was opened on 16 June 2013.

Facilities
The airport has a runway that is 2,600 meters long and 45 meters wide (class 4C), and a 7,100 square meter terminal building. It is projected to handle 200,000 passengers annually by 2020.

Airlines and destinations

See also
List of airports in China
List of the busiest airports in China

References

Airports in Guizhou
Airports established in 2013
2013 establishments in China
Bijie